Cumbie Glacier is a short, steep glacier just east of the Scott Nunataks, flowing north into the Swinburne Ice Shelf along the southwest side of Sulzberger Bay. It was mapped by the United States Geological Survey from surveys and from U.S. Navy air photos, 1959–66, and named by the Advisory Committee on Antarctic Names for William A. Cumbie, Jr., U.S. Navy. An aviation electronics technician, Cumbie was a radioman on the ski-equipped R4D aircraft carrying Rear Admiral George Dufek that was the first to land at the geographic South Pole, October 31, 1956.

See also
 List of glaciers in the Antarctic
 Glaciology

References
 

Glaciers of King Edward VII Land